Honegger is a surname. Notable people with the surname include:

 Arthur Honegger (1892–1955), Swiss composer
 Blanche Honegger Moyse (1909–2011), American conductor
 Doug Honegger (born 1968), Canadian-born former Swiss professional ice hockey defenceman
 Elise Honegger (1839–1912), Swiss feminist and journalist
 Eric Honegger (born 1946), Swiss politician, member of the FDP.The Liberals party, and manager
 Fritz Honegger (1917–1999), Swiss politician
 Gottfried Honegger (1917–2016), Swiss artist and graphic designer
 Marc Honegger (1926–2003), French musicologist and choirmaster
Rosmarie Honegger (born 1947), Swiss lichenologist 
 Sylvia Honegger (born 1968), Swiss cross country skier

Swiss-German surnames
Jewish surnames